Solomon Adler (August 6, 1909 – August 4, 1994) worked as U.S. Treasury representative in China during World War II.

He was identified by Whittaker Chambers and Elizabeth Bentley as a Soviet spy and resigned from the Treasury Department in 1950. After several years teaching at Cambridge University in England, he returned to China, where he resided from the 1960s to his death, working as a translator and economic advisor.

From the early 1960s, Adler was also affiliated with the International Liaison Department, an important organ of the Chinese Communist Party organ whose functions include foreign intelligence.

Early life 
Solomon Adler was born on 6 August 1909 in Leeds, England. The Adler family was of Jewish ancestry and originally from Karelitz, Belarus, moving to Leeds in 1900. Solomon Adler was the fifth of ten children; the oldest was Saul Adler, who became a well-known Israeli parasitologist. Adler studied economics at Oxford and University College, London. He came to the United States in 1935 to do research.

Career 
In 1936, he was hired at the Works Progress Administration's National Research Project but soon moved to the Treasury Department's Division of Monetary Research and Statistics, where he worked with Harry Dexter White for the next several years.

Adler became a naturalized US citizen in 1940. In 1941, he was posted to China, where he remained as Treasury representative until 1948. His reports from China to Treasury secretary Henry Morgenthau Jr.,  during the war years were widely circulated and played an important role in shaping American wartime economic policy toward China.

In 1949, Adler became the subject of a Loyalty of Government Employees investigation. He resigned before the case was resolved and returned to Britain, where he taught for several years at Cambridge University. When his US passport expired, he was denaturalized and lost his citizenship. Adler moved to China in the early 1960s, working in the lead group of the team translating Mao Zedong's works into English.

Later life 
When the United States re-established diplomatic contacts with China in 1971, Adler renewed his US citizenship . He died in Beijing on August 4, 1994, two days before his 85th birthday.

Espionage
In 1939, Whittaker Chambers identified Adler to then-Assistant Secretary of State Adolf Berle as a member of an underground Communist group in Washington, DC, the Ware group. Chambers correctly identified Adler as serving in the General Counsel's Office at the Treasury Department, from which, Chambers said, Adler supplied weekly reports to the Communist Party of the United States. In 1945, Elizabeth Bentley identified Adler as a member of the Silvermaster group. A 1948 memo written by Anatoly Gorsky, a former NKVD rezident in Washington DC, identified Adler as a Soviet agent designated "Sax." That agent, transliterated "Sachs (Saks)" appears in the Venona decrypts supplying information about the Chinese Communists by both Gorsky and the head of the US Communist Party, Earl Browder.

In addition to his contacts with US espionage groups, while he was serving as Treasury attache in China in 1944, Adler shared a house with Chinese Communist secret agent Chi Ch'ao-ting and State Department officer John Stewart Service, who was arrested the next year in the Amerasia case.

Together with Harry Dexter White, Assistant Secretary of the Treasury, and V. Frank Coe, Director of the Treasury's Division of Monetary Research, Adler strongly opposed a gold loan program of $200 million to help the Chinese Nationalists control the inflation that took hold in unoccupied China during World War II. Between 1943 and 1945, prices rose more than 1,000% per year, weakening the Nationalist government. The inflation helped the Communists eventually come to power in China, and in later years White, Coe, and Adler were accused of having deliberately fostered inflation by obstructing the stabilization loan.

A Chinese work published in 1983 stated that from 1963 on Adler worked for China's International Liaison Department, an organ of the Chinese Communist Party whose functions include foreign intelligence. According to historian R. Bruce Craig, Adler's apartment in Beijing was provided by the Liaison Department, indicating that the department was Adler's work unit.

References

Sources 
Solomon Adler: The Chinese Economy (London, Routledge & Paul 1957)
Joan Robinson, Sol Adler: China: an economic perspective, foreword by Harold Wilson (London, Fabian International Bureau 1958)
Sol Adler: A Talk to Comrades of the English Section for the Translation of Volume V of Chairman Mao's Selected Works (Guānyú "Máo xuǎn" dì-wǔ juǎn fānyì wèntí de bàogào 关于《毛选》第五卷翻译问题的报告; Beijing, Foreign Languages Press 1978).

Further reading 
 Craig, R. Bruce. Treasonable Doubt: The Harry Dexter White Spy Case. Lawrence, KS: University Press of Kansas, 2004.
 Gavron, Daniel. Saul Adler: Pioneer of Tropical Medicine. Rehovot, Israel: Balaban, 1997.
 Haynes, John Earl. "Russian Archival Identification of Real Names Behind Cover Names in VENONA." http://www.johnearlhaynes.org/page59.html
 Haynes, John Earl and Harvey Klehr. Venona: Decoding Soviet Espionage in America. Yale University Press, 1999.
 Klehr, Harvey and Ronald Radosh. The Amerasia Spy Case. Chapel Hill, NC: University of North Carolina Press, 1996.
 Olmsted, Kathryn S. Red Spy Queen: A Biography of Elizabeth Bentley. Chapel Hill, NC: University of North Carolina Press, 2002.
 Rittenberg, Sidney and Amanda Bennett. The Man Who Stayed Behind. New York: Simon and Schuster, 1993.
 Weinstein, Allen. Perjury: The Hiss-Chambers Case. New York: Knopf, 1997.

External links
Funeral of Sol Adler (China News Digest, September 7, 1994)

1909 births
1994 deaths
Alumni of the University of Oxford
Alumni of University College London
English emigrants to the United States
English Jews
English people of Belarusian-Jewish descent
American people of Belarusian-Jewish descent
American expatriates in China
20th-century British economists
American defectors to China